Redkino (Ušmen) is a rural locality (a village) in Kuyanovsky Selsoviet, Krasnokamsky District, Bashkortostan, Russia. The population was 898 as of 2010. There are 10 streets.

Geography 
Redkino is located 50 km southeast of Nikolo-Beryozovka (the district's administrative centre) by road. Kuyanovo is the nearest rural locality.

References 

Rural localities in Krasnokamsky District